Alessandro Pieri (born October 29, 1963) is an Italian sprint canoer who competed in the late 1980s. At the 1988 Summer Olympics in Seoul, he finished seventh in the K-4 1000 m event while being eliminated in the semifinals of the K-2 1000 m event.

References
Sports-Reference.com profile

1963 births
Canoeists at the 1988 Summer Olympics
Italian male canoeists
Living people
Olympic canoeists of Italy
20th-century Italian people